Vanadium(III) acetylacetonate is the coordination compound with the formula V(C5H7O2)3, sometimes designated as V(acac)3. It is an orange-brown solid that is soluble in organic solvents.

Structure and synthesis
The complex has idealized D3 symmetry. Like other V(III) compounds, it has a triplet ground state.

The compound is prepared by reduction of ammonium vanadate in the presence of acetylacetone.

Applications and research
V(acac)3 is a common precatalyst for the production of EPDM polymers.

It has also been shown to be a precursor to vanadium pentoxide nanostructures.

References

Acetylacetonate complexes
Vanadium(III) compounds